Jean-Paul Goude (born 8 December 1938 in Montreuil (France)) is a French graphic designer, illustrator, photographer, advertising film director and event designer. He worked as art director at Esquire magazine in New York City during the 1970s, and famously choreographed the 1989 Bicentennial Parade in Paris to mark the 200th anniversary of the French Revolution. In addition, over the last three decades, he has created well-known campaigns and illustrations for brands including Perrier, Citroën, Kodak, Chanel, Kenzo, Shiseido, Cacharel, H&M, Galeries Lafayette and Desigual.

Exhibitions
After "Goudemalion" his enormously successful retrospective at the Musée des Arts Décoratifs, Paris (2011), other retrospective exhibitions followed: such as "Image makers", along with David Lynch, Bob Wilson and Norikata Tatehana at the 21 21 Design Sight (2015), "In Goude we trust!" at Chanel Nexus Hall (2018) in Tokyo, as well as "So Far So Goude" at the Kyotographie photography festival in Kyoto (2018), his work has been regularly exhibited at the Paris Centre Pompidou since 2015.He has also been the guest of Kyotographie Festival in 2018 with an exhibition entitled "So Far So Goude", then presents In Goude We Trust at Chanel Nexus Hall in Tokyo (2018) and at Palazzo Giureconsulti in Milano (2019).

Early life
Jean-Paul Goude was born on 8 December 1938 to an American ballet dancer, and a French elevator repairman, and grew up in the Paris suburb of Saint-Mande. As a child, Goude's mother recognized his natural sense of rhythm, but the most notable characteristic that Goude acknowledged in his childhood self, was a fascination with Aboriginal and black people. From as early as he can remember, Goude would draw images of aboriginals and black people, and would write stories about the characters he created. For Goude, Aboriginals were his heroes; he would draw them fighting white cowboys, and unsurprisingly, the Aboriginals would always win. Although they were his heroes, black people would soon hold a larger place in his heart.

Goude and his mother shared a fascination with black people. As a ballet dancer, his mother envied the beauty of the black dancers she worked with and described to her son the jet-black skin of the chorus girls, as well as the unique ways in which the women would move their bodies. Her eyes would light up as she spoke of the black performers, and Goude would listen, soaking in the views of his mother. In Goude's book Jungle Fever, he shares an image of his mother dancing in the middle of several men sporting blackface makeup. Goude would also utilize blackface in his photography career. Over the years, this fascination with black people would only become more feverish, and as Goude began to dabble in fashion drawings, the models he depicted would always have dark skin. The seldom times that Goude would produce imagery of whites in his drawings, they always had flat noses and thick lips, described by the artist as "Negroid features". These characteristics can still be seen in Goude's work, as the vast majority of his models are black women. Even decades later, the views developed with the help of his mother continue to fuel Goude's passion for photography. She also inspired him by exposing him to different forms of print media. "At home, we received American magazines," Goude told Vogue magazine. "The advertising, in the 1960s, was extraordinary. The first time an issue of Esquire arrived with a cover by George Lois, I said to myself, that's what I want to do." He studied at the Ecole Nationale Superieure des Arts Decoratifs in Paris before embarking on his career as an illustrator.

Career

Esquire magazine
In 1968, Harold Hayes, editor of Esquire magazine, asked Goude to art direct a special edition of the magazine to celebrate its 75th issue. Several months later, Goude was asked to become the magazine's full-time art editor, despite having limited experience working with layouts. Goude told WWD, "Harold Hayes...called and asked if I knew anyone that would be good for the job of art director; I proposed myself. A few days later, he offered me the job. I took everything I owned and moved to New York. I stayed for seven years and it was great, but I was not prepared for the literary world. I wish I had known more about it. I would see Gore Vidal in the hallways of Esquire. It was exciting." There, his illustrations for the magazine, including an oil-on-photo painting of Chairman Mao Zedong breasting the waves of the Yangtze River with a rubber Donald Duckie, have been described as skirting on the edges of surrealism.

Grace Jones
Goude worked closely with model-turned-pop-singer Grace Jones, consulting on her image, choreographing her live stage performances, directing her music videos, and creating her album covers. The two met during New York's disco scene, stating in a 2009 interview "In 1977 or '78, I met Grace and it was a period of decadence. People were still doing lots of drugs and I had been working so hard for so long and she made me part of her lifestyle, made me go out dancing at Studio 54. She became an obsession and we did everything together." Soon after meeting, Goude and Jones pursued a romantic relationship, and he began stage-managing her live shows and creating her album covers. Goude used retouching before computer manipulation to depict Jones in an impossible pose for her Island Life album. Jones also appeared in much of Goude's other work, including his 1985 Citroën CX 2 commercial.

Controversial creations 
Goude is often recognized for his humorous and illusory style. Creating post-modern art, Goude is recognized as avant-garde, "constantly [blurring] the boundaries between publicity and high art" in his advertising campaigns. In comparing Goude's advertisements to his "art pieces", several distinctions can be made. To begin, advertisements that Goude creates on commission almost never display black men or women, are often colourful, and are read as humorous and playful.

Jungle Fever 

Goude's book, Jungle Fever, has been described as an autobiographical exploration of his career. Published in 1983, Jungle Fever includes many of Goude's photographs and manipulations of black women, as well as insights to his personal life with his muses, and his beliefs about the black female form. The book does not feature any of Goude's commercial imagery, displaying only his artistic representations of ethnic minorities, with an emphasis on black people. The book is separated into several chapters, each titled with the name of the models used in his photographs. Goude was known for creating exaggerated and manipulated forms using collage and post-production tactics and the book shows the progression of several works from sketch to finished work. Examples of these techniques can be found within the book in images such as "Carolina Beaumont" and "Island Life". In "Island Life," a photo which he created for cover for Grace Jones's album of the same name, Goude photographed her in several different positions, then overlaid the images to elongate the neck, and legs, and to display her torso completely turned forward. He would then paint in the gaps between body parts to make the image appear natural. The position is wholly unnatural, and aside from highlighting features that are stereotypically fetishized in black women, the image also implies that no woman other than Jones could assume such a position. Such an effect is achieved by painting over the printed images during the post-production phase of Goude's process. This effect can be seen several times in the Grace Jones chapter of the book, first in comparing the final Island Life cover to the photo in the process of being edited, and secondly in "Blue-black in black on brown," in which her skin is painted a dark, blue-black tone.

Kim Kardashian 
In 2014, Goude photographed Kim Kardashian for Paper magazine. When the photos were released, their popularity and topicality were said to "break the Internet," just as the magazine's accompanying caption indicated. One of the images was a recreation of Goude's earlier work "Carolina Beaumont". Like the earlier image, the new photo features Kardashian holding an exploding champagne bottle, with the spray arcing over her head and landing in a champagne glass balanced on her buttocks. Others have drawn the comparison between these photos and depictions of Sarah Baartman, seeing them as part of the continuing history of the exploitation of black women's bodies.

Television commercials
Goude's first television advertisement was a TV spot for Lee Cooper Jeans in 1982, in which he filmed a 10-minute mini opera set to Igor Stravinsky's The Rite of Spring. He has also created advertisements for clients such as Azzedine Alaia, Perrier, and Cacharel. In 1984, Goude shot a spot for Kodak that followed the adventures of the Kodakettes, mischievous kids clad in red-and-white stripes. In 1992, he filmed an ad for Chanel Fragrance in which he put model Vanessa Paradis in a birdcage, because he thought she looked like Tweety.

Print campaigns
Some of Goude's most celebrated print campaigns have been for Galeries Lafayette, a leading Parisian department store. Goude has worked with the company for more than 10 years, and has been given considerable creative freedom. He's opted to shoot the ongoing adventures of "a comic book character, half way between Hergé's Tintin and a heroine of an early Pearl Buck novel".

Personal life
Throughout his career, Goude associated with numerous models. Goude dated several of these muses, including Farida Khelfa, Toukie Smith, Radiah Frye, and, most notably, Grace Jones.

Goude's relationship with Jones began in 1977, when Jones asked Goude for advice in creating album artwork and music videos. Goude was instantly attracted to her, believing that she was an embodiment of his ideal woman. In their relationship, the curiosity and mystery of dating a foreigner drew the two together. As his muse, Grace Jones figured prominently in Goude's work. 
Goude has a son, Paulo (b. 12 November 1979), with Grace Jones. He has another son, Theo, and a daughter, Loreleï, with his wife Karen Park Goude.

Selected works
 Several iconic images and music videos for Grace Jones 
 Citroën CX, ad, 1984, with the car driving into the mouth of a giant robotic head looking like Grace Jones. Banned in several countries at the time.
 Design of the French Bicentennial 14 July parade on the Champ Elysées, 1989
 Chanel Egoïste, ad, 1990
 Chanel Coco (fragrance), ad, 1991, with Vanessa Paradis as a bird in a cage
 Logo of television channel La Cinq, 1991 (used until the channel's bankruptcy in April 1992)
 Prada (Candy) with (Léa Seydoux)
 Shiseido (Zen parfum)
 Jungle Fever
 "Break the Internet" photos with Kim Kardashian for Paper magazine
 Rest (Charlotte Gainsbourg album), Album artwork

References

External links

Official website
 
 Jean-Paul Goude at The Music Video DataBase
Model of Pictures
d'art et de culture, issue 24 (winter 2013), magazine cover and exclusive interview: That's all Goude! (Excerpt)

Living people
People from Saint-Mandé
French film directors
French photographers
Album-cover and concert-poster artists
École nationale supérieure des arts décoratifs alumni
1938 births